Chryse Planitia  (Greek, "Golden Plain") is a smooth circular plain in the northern equatorial region of Mars close to the Tharsis region to the west, centered at . Chryse Planitia lies partially in the Lunae Palus quadrangle, partially in the Oxia Palus quadrangle, partially in the Mare Acidalium quadrangle.  It is 1600 km or 994 mi in diameter and with a floor 2.5 km below the average planetary surface altitude, and has been suggested to be an ancient buried impact basin, though this is contested. It has several features in common with lunar maria, such as wrinkle ridges. The density of impact craters in the  range is close to half the average for lunar maria.

Chryse Planitia shows evidence of water erosion in the past, and is the bottom end for many outflow channels from the southern highlands as well as from Valles Marineris and the flanks of the Tharsis bulge. It is one of the lowest regions on Mars ( below the mean surface elevation of Mars), so water would tend to flow into it.  The elevation generally goes down from the Tharsis Ridge to Chryse. Kasei Valles, Maja Valles, and Nanedi Valles
appear to run from high areas (Tharsis Ridge) to Chryse Planitia.  On the other side of Chryse, to the east, the land gets higher. Ares Vallis travels from this high region, then empties into Chryse.  Much of Tiu Valles and Simud Valles move toward Chryse as well.
Several ancient river valleys discovered in Chryse Planitia by the Viking Orbiters, as part of the Viking program, provided strong evidence for a great deal of running water on the surface of Mars.

It has been theorized that the Chryse basin may have contained a large lake or an ocean during the Hesperian or early Amazonian periods since all of the large outflow channels entering it end at the same elevation, at which some surface features suggest an ancient shoreline may be present. Chryse basin opens into the North Polar Basin, so if an ocean was present Chryse would have been a large bay.

Viking 1 landed in Chryse Planitia in 1976, but its landing site was not near the outflow channels and no fluvial features were visible; the terrain at that point appeared primarily volcanic in origin. The Mars Pathfinder landed in Ares Vallis, at the end of one of the outflow channels emptying into Chryse.

See also
 Chryse Alien
 List of plains on Mars
 Geography of Mars
 Climate of Mars

References

External links
Google Mars scrollable map – centered on Chryse Planitia
Martel, L.M.V. (June 2001) Outflow Channels May Make a Case for a Bygone Ocean on Mars. Planetary Science Research Discoveries. http://www.psrd.hawaii.edu/June01/MarsChryse.html

Plains on Mars

Lunae Palus quadrangle
Oxia Palus quadrangle
Mare Acidalium quadrangle